Gordon F. Joseloff (May 13, 1945 – November 9, 2020) was formerly the First Selectman of Westport, Connecticut and an Emmy Award-winning journalist. A former foreign correspondent for CBS News and United Press International, Joseloff was also the founding editor and publisher of WestportNow, a local news and information website he established in 2003.

He was elected as First Selectman of Westport in 2005 with almost 60 percent of the vote and re-elected in 2009 with almost 52 percent. He earlier served 14 years on the Westport Representative Town Meeting (RTM), the town's legislative body, including 10 as its moderator, or president.

References

External links
 Gordon's Journal (archived)

Connecticut local politicians
1945 births
2020 deaths
People from Westport, Connecticut
Journalists from Connecticut
Journalists from New York City
Politicians from New York City
Connecticut Democrats
McBurney School alumni